The expansion of the  North American Numbering Plan (NANP) is an anticipated requirement to provide more telephone numbers to accommodate future needs beyond the pool of ten-digit telephone numbers in use since the inception of the NANP in 1947. An October 2020 analysis estimated that the current numbering plan would not be exhausted until after the year 2050.

History

The North American Numbering Plan was devised in the 1940s, was implemented in 1947, and has provided customer direct-dialed long-distance telephone service since 1951. Occasionally, the growing demand for telephone numbers has mandated certain changes in the format of telephone numbers and the method by which they are allocated to telephone companies. Instead of expanding the size of telephone numbers, as implemented in many countries outside North America, the NANP was designed as a closed numbering plan, having a fixed number of digits, three digits for the numbering plan area (NPA) code and seven digits for telephone numbers that are unique in each NPA. The telephone number was further distinguished as consisting of three digits that identified each central office and four digits for each subscriber station connected to the same central office. From 1947 to c. 1960, the initial two digits of the central office code were mapped to two letters of an often locally significant name, the central office name or exchange name. However, this scheme, practiced since its invention by W. G. Blauvelt of AT&T in 1917, prevented the use of numerous digit combinations that could only be associated with unpronounceable or, at best, confusable names. All-number calling removed these restrictions and permitted the phasing out of exchange names.  Central office codes were initially still restricted from using digits 0 and 1 in the middle position, which provided a contrast with area codes, which always had 0 or 1 in the middle position. This last restriction was removed by 1995, with the phase-out of electromechanical switching systems by programmable electronic switching systems (ESS).

Every place in the countries and territories of the NANP belongs to a numbering plan area. Assigning a new area code requires either geographically splitting an existing numbering plan area (split plan) and reassigning the subscribers in the new, smaller area to a new area code, or assigning an additional area code to an existing numbering plan area, which is called an overlay plan. The first new area codes were geographic splits, until the geographical areas were at risk of becoming unreasonably small. Since then, most new area codes are assigned in overlays. When a numbering plan area has more than one area code, telephone companies can no longer support dialing seven-digit local numbers, and require ten-digit dialing for all calls within the geographical area.

Ten decimal digits allow a maximum of 10 billion telephone numbers. The numbering rules of the NANP reduce that to 6.4 billion telephone numbers. However, a considerable percentage of these numbers will remain unused when the last available NPA code is assigned, because thousands of numbers will be reserved in exchanges that serve only small population centers, the exchange being served by a single NPA-NXX combination in non-competitive markets. More combinations would be partially unused in the event that a small market has competitive providers.

Many blocks of numbers that were unassignable have been reclaimed by rate center consolidation and number pooling in the US.

Expansion options have been discussed in industry forums for several years and recommendations for expansion have been analyzed and proposed.

The NANPA regularly performs exhaustion analyses. The April 2019 analysis anticipates exhaustion after 2049.

Industry recommendations

In NANPA telephone number specifications, the letter N represents a numeral from 2 through 9, while the letter X represents any numeral. Thus, NXX is a number from 200 through 999, while XXXX is a range from 0000 through 9999. The first three digits of a NANP number are the numbering plan area code, NPA code, or simply NPA, the next three, NXX, identify the central office, and the last four are the line number of an individual office.

The telephone industry's current recommendation assumes first that mandatory dialing of all ten digits is required to complete telephone numbers, even for a local call, throughout the North American Numbering Plan area, which includes many Caribbean and Pacific territories and nations.

The plan proposes the insertion of 00 or 11 between the NPA and the NXX, to produce 12-digit numbers. The plan further proposes that the US would use either 00 or 11, while Canada would use the other, in order to allow customers to distinguish countries by use of these digits, which do not appear at the beginning of the 12-digit number.  This distinction would quickly vanish as digits other than 0 and 1 are used in these positions after permissive dialing ends.

Under this proposal, the N9X format NPA codes, which are currently reserved from assignment, would be released and be available for normal assignment for code relief and other purposes.

Examples
For these examples, it is assumed that the new digits will be 00 for the US, and 11 for Canada. With these assumptions, under this plan, the New Jersey telephone number (609) 555-0175 would become (6090) 0555-0175, and would be dialed as such. Likewise, the Ontario number (613) 555-0175 would become (6131) 1555-0175.

One advantage is that, during the transition period, permissive dialing could be enabled. This means that until everyone has adjusted to the new dialing system, users would still be able to dial the shorter, 10-digit numbers. Since currently the 4th digit (or digit 'D') cannot be 1 or 0, if the telephone system detects 1 or 0 in the 4th position it will process the number as a new 12-digit number, and if it is any digit other than 1 or 0, it can process it as an existing 10-digit number until the transition is complete.

Other proposals

Proposals that utilize the reserved N9X-format codes for expansion include the following proposals:

N9XX, with no change to the remainder of the phone number
This proposal would expand numbers to eleven digits overall. A 9 would be inserted as the new second digit of all area codes (e.g. 212 would become 2912, 916 would become 9916). Permissive dialing would be allowed because exchange equipment, on detecting a 9 as the second digit of the area code, would respond appropriately to expect 11 digits, or 10 in the absence of a 9 in that position.

Under this plan, the New Jersey telephone number (609) 555-0175 would become (6909) 555-0175.

The permissive dialing period where detecting the 9 as the second digit (to expect 11 numbers) would eventually have an end date, and then new NPAs with a second digit other than 9 could be assigned, effectively multiplying the number of NPAs by ten. As with the current 3 digit scheme excluding 9 as a second digit, one number in the 2nd digit position could be reserved for a future expansion from 4 to 5 digits.

N9XX, with a new initial digit
With a new initial digit in front of the last seven digits of the phone number, this proposal would expand numbers to twelve digits overall. As with the above plan, a 9 would be inserted as the new second digit of all area codes. A potential problem would occur with permissive dialing of local calls where the area code is not presently required (areas with no overlay in effect). If the added digit were 3, for example, numbers that already begin with a 3 would present a problem, probably resolved using either a "time-out" if the customer only dials seven digits, or a flash-cut to mandatory eight-digit dialing.

Under this plan, the New Jersey telephone number (609) 555-0175 could become (6909) 3555-0175, although the added '3' in the middle block could theoretically be any digit.

An advantage of expanding to 12 digits under this plan is that the area codes would be "consumed" at a much slower rate, as there would be ten times as many possible combinations in each area code.

References

External links
INC Document

North American Numbering Plan